The following is family tree of the Malay monarchs of Perak, from the establishment of the sultanate in 1528 until present day.

House of Melaka-Perak

House of Siak-Perak

References

Bibliography
 
 
 
 

Perak